The Prospect Before Us is a one act comic ballet in seven scenes, choreographed for the Vic-Wells Ballet by Ninette de Valois to music by William Boyce arranged by Constant Lambert.

Overview
With its premiere in 1940, the first year of the war, de Valois set out to produce a light-hearted and jolly piece of escapism. Inspired by an eponymous 18th century engraving by Thomas Rowlandson, it has an intricate plot about the rivalry of two 18th century theatrical managers who fight over a troupe of dancers that includes Didelot, Noverre, and Vestris. The final scene with Robert Helpmann as Mr. O'Reilly doing a "drunk dance" is well known.

Premiere cast
 Robert Helpmann as Mr. O'Reilly of the Pantheon
 Claude Newman as Mr. Taylor of the King's Theatre
 Frederick Ashton as Monsieur Noverre
 Alan Carter as Monsieur Didelot
 John Hart as Monsieur Vestris
 John Field
 Deryk Mendel
 Michael Somes
 Leslie Edwards
 Pamela May

Source:

See also
 List of historical ballet characters

References
Notes

Sources
 Wearing, J. P. (2014). The London Stage 1940-1949: A Calendar of Productions, Performers, and Personnel. Rowman & Littlefield Publishers.

External links
 Short BBC excerpt from Dancing in the Blitz

Ballets by Constant Lambert
Ballets by Ninette de Valois
1940 ballet premieres